Mehmet Ali Yalım (1 April 1929 – 28 January 1992) was a Turkish basketball player. He competed in the men's tournament at the 1952 Summer Olympics.

References

External links
 

1929 births
1992 deaths
Turkish men's basketball players
Olympic basketball players of Turkey
Basketball players at the 1952 Summer Olympics
Place of birth missing